ǃOrakobab or Khoemana, also known as Korana, ǃOra, or Griqua, is a moribund Khoe language of South Africa.

Names
"Khoemana" (from khoe 'person' + mana 'language') is more commonly known as either Korana  (also ǃOrakobab, ǃOra, Kora, Koraqua) or Griqua (also Gri , Xri, Xiri, Xirikwa). The name 'Korana' reflects the endonym ǃOra  or ǃGora , referring to the ǃOra people. Sometimes ǃOra is also known as Cape Khoe or Cape Hottentot, though the latter has become considered derogatory. The various names are often treated as different languages (called South Khoekhoe when taken together), but they do not correspond to any actual dialect distinctions, and speakers may use "Korana" and "Griqua" interchangeably. Both names are also used more broadly, for example for the Griqua people. There exist (or existed) several dialects of Khoemana, but the details are unknown.

Phonology
Khoemana is closely related to Khoekhoe, and the sound systems are broadly similar. The strongly aspirated Khoekhoe affricates are simply aspirated plosives  in Khoemana. However, Khoemana has an ejective velar affricate, which is not found in Khoekhoe, and a corresponding series of clicks, . In addition, about half of all lexical words in Khoemana began with a click, compared to a quarter in Khoekhoe.

In Korana, [oe] and [oa] can be pronounced as [we] and [wa].

 The phoneme [k] can be realized as /c/ before [e] or [i].
 An intervocalic [p] and [b] are sometimes realized as /β/.
 [s] is stated to be alveolar-postalveolar when not followed by a close front vowel [i], [ĩ], or [e].
 The aspirated phoneme [tʰ] is realized as an affricate sound /ts/ when followed by a close front vowel [i], [ĩ], or [e].
 The aspirated sound [kʰ] can sometimes be realized as [kx]. Some Griqua speakers may pronounce [kʰ] as [kʼ].
 The [tsʼ] sound only seldom occurs.
 [m] and [n] can occur syllabically as [m̩] and [n̩].
 The trilled [r] can also be realized as a flapped [ɾ] in some speech.
 Voicing can be very weak in Khoemana in casual speech, so voiced plosives can be hard to distinguish from voiceless plosives.

There are four tones in Khoemana:

Population
Reports as to the number of Khoemana speakers are contradictory, but it is clear that it is nearly extinct. It was thought to be extinct until the discovery of four elderly speakers around Bloemfontein and Kimberley. A 2009 report by Don Killian of the University of Helsinki estimated that there were less than 30 speakers at the time. Matthias Brenzinger reported in 2012 that one possible speaker remained, but that she refused to speak the language. The discrepancies could be because the language has multiple dialects and goes by several names, with scholars not always referring to the same population. Khoemana is listed as "critically endangered" in UNESCO's Language Atlas. The loss of this endangered language would have a significant impact on the heritage and culture of Khoemana speakers.

Attestation
Robust Khoemana (before more recent language attrition) is principally recorded in an 1879 notebook by Lucy Lloyd, which contains five short stories; some additional work was done in Ponelis (1975). As of 2009, the EuroBABEL project is searching for remaining speakers.

History

The people and their language first began to attract scholarly attention in the 1660s, coinciding with Dutch colonial efforts in the Cape of Good Hope and the resulting armed conflicts. At the time, Khoemana was widely spoken throughout the coastal regions of South Africa. After years of attrition during the colonial era to the 1930s, and under apartheid from 1948 to 1994, the language has all but vanished. Currently, speakers of Khoemana are not only scarce but scattered, due to forced migrations during the apartheid era. This has rendered the language particularly vulnerable.

References

Further reading
 
 
 
 
 
 
 
Maingard, L.F. 1962. Korana Folktales. Grammar and Texts. Johannesburg: Witwatersrand University Press

External links
 
ǃKorana basic lexicon at the Global Lexicostatistical Database
ELAR archive of Dictionary of Korana ('Ora)
Rosetta Project: Xiri Swadesh List

Khoe languages
Griqua
Languages of South Africa
Languages of Namibia
Endangered languages of Africa